Patrick Thomas O'Brien (born 1951) is an American actor.  He is perhaps best known for playing the role of Mr. Dewey, the math teacher from Saved by the Bell.

Life and career
O'Brien was born in Wisconsin and graduated from Regis High School in Eau Claire.  He then attended the University of Wisconsin-Eau Claire receiving his B.A. in 1975. O'Brien has appeared in several films including The Personals, Airborne, Stuart Little, The Curious Case of Benjamin Button, Catch Me If You Can and Kiss the Girls.  Despite several movie appearances, the majority of O'Brien's career has centered on television, which has included appearances on Monk, It's Always Sunny in Philadelphia, Sabrina the Teenage Witch, Gilmore Girls, The West Wing, Married With Children, Baywatch, Boston Common, Parker Lewis Can't Lose, Saved By The Bell, and Home Improvement. He moved to Minneapolis in 2004 and has been performing, directing, and producing for various theaters in the Twin Cities.

Filmography

References

External links

1951 births
Living people
American male television actors
American male film actors
20th-century American male actors
21st-century American male actors
University of Wisconsin–Eau Claire alumni